Sticta arachnofuliginosa is a species of foliose lichen in the family Peltigeraceae. Found in Central America and South America, it was formally described by Bibiana Moncada and Robert Lücking in 2012. The lichen, which usually grows on bark but has also been recorded growing on soil, tends to associates with liverworts from the genera Metzgeria, Lepicolea, Plagiochila, as well as the lichen Heterodermia circinalis. The specific epithet alludes to its resemblance to Sticta fuliginosa.

References

arachnofuliginosa
Lichen species
Lichens described in 2012
Lichens of Central America
Lichens of South America
Taxa named by Robert Lücking